The National Science Bee is a buzzer-based quiz competition for elementary through high school students in America. Among the topics it tests are biology, chemistry, physics, earth science, astronomy, computer science, and mathematics. It is organized by International Academic Competitions and follows a format similar to the National History Bee and US History Bee, among others. The National Science Bee is rapidly expanding and now hosts Varsity and Junior Varsity divisions, in addition to Middle and Elementary School divisions.

Format of Competition

Varsity and Junior Varsity Divisions

The Varsity and Junior Varsity divisions of the National Science Bee debuted for the 2019–2020 season. At these levels, there are two stages of competition: the National Qualifying Exam and the National Championships. The exam consists of 50 multiple choice questions, with 2 points awarded for correct answers, 0 for blank answers, and -1 for incorrect answers. There are three versions of the exam (Set A, Set B, Set C), effectively giving students three opportunities to score at or above the National Median and thus qualify for Nationals. The National Championships are entirely buzzer-based with 4 preliminary rounds and 2 playoff rounds. For the 2020 National Championships, $500 was awarded to each champion, $300 to second place, and $200 to third place.

Middle and Elementary School Divisions

For its first couple years, the National Science Bee consisted of only Middle and Elementary School divisions, which then split into 8th grade, 7th grade, 6th grade, and Elementary School. These levels consist of three stages: the Online Regional Qualifying Exam (ORQE), Regional Finals, and National Championships. The ORQE is free of charge and can be taken under supervision at school or at home. Students achieving a certain score (which varies by year) on the ORQE are eligible for the Regional Finals, where the top half of competitors qualify for Nationals. At the Middle and Elementary School level, the National Championships of the National Science Bee are held in conjunction with the National History Bee and Bowl, National Humanities Bee, US Academic Bee and Bowl, United States Geography Championships, and International Geography Bee. Unlike the Varsity and JV, the Middle and Elementary School divisions consist of 6 preliminary rounds and 4 playoff rounds with 30 and 35 questions, respectively, at Nationals.

National Science Bee National Champions

Varsity Division

Junior Varsity Division

Middle School Divisions

Elementary School Divisions

See also
 International Academic Competitions
 National History Bee and Bowl
 International History Olympiad
 United States Geography Championships

References

Education competitions in the United States
2010 establishments in the United States
International Academic Competitions